Frederick Laurence Schaffner (August 18, 1855 – May 22, 1935) was a Canadian physician and politician.

Born in Williamstown, Nova Scotia, the son of William C. Schaffner and A. Schaffner, his father of German and his mother of English descent, Schaffner was received a B.A. degree from Acadia University and a M.D., C.M. degree from Trinity College in Toronto. He was a member of the Manitoba Board of Health, a coroner, and Health Officer of the municipalities of Morton and Boissevain. He was a city councillor and Mayor of Boissevain, Manitoba.

Schaffner was elected to the House of Commons of Canada for the Manitoba electoral district of Souris in the 1904 federal election. A Conservative, he was re-elected in 1908 and 1911. During World War I, he was a medical officer in the Royal Canadian Army Medical Corps. In 1917, he was summoned to the Senate of Canada on the advice of Robert Laird Borden representing the senatorial division of Souris, Manitoba. He served until his death in 1935.

References
 
 The Canadian Parliament; biographical sketches and photo-engravures of the senators and members of the House of Commons of Canada. Being the tenth Parliament, elected November 3, 1904

1855 births
1935 deaths
Physicians from Manitoba
Canadian senators from Manitoba
Conservative Party of Canada (1867–1942) MPs
Conservative Party of Canada (1867–1942) senators
Members of the House of Commons of Canada from Manitoba
Trinity College (Canada) alumni
University of Toronto alumni
Mayors of places in Manitoba
People from Boissevain, Manitoba
Canadian coroners